Aeolidiella is a genus of sea slugs, aeolid nudibranchs, marine gastropod molluscs in the family Aeolidiidae.

Species
Species within the genus Aeolidiella include:
 Aeolidiella albopunctata Lin, 1992
 Aeolidiella alderi (Cocks, 1852)
 Aeolidiella drusilla Bergh, 1900
 Aeolidiella glauca (Alder & Hancock, 1845)
 Aeolidiella rubra (Cantraine, 1835)
 Aeolidiella sanguinea (Norman, 1877)

Synonyms
 Aeolidiella alba Risbec, 1928: synonym of Bulbaeolidia alba (Risbec, 1928)
 Aeolidiella bassethulli Risbec, 1928: synonym of Anteaeolidiella cacaotica (Stimpson, 1855)
 Aeolidiella benteva (Er. Marcus, 1958): synonym of Anteaeolidiella benteva (Er. Marcus, 1958)
 Aeolidiella chromosoma (Cockerell & Eliot, 1905): synonym of Spurilla chromosoma Cockerell & Eliot, 1905
 Aeolidiella croisicensis Labbé, 1923: synonym of Spurilla croisicensis (Labbé, 1923)
 Aeolidiella faustina Bergh, 1900: synonym of Spurilla faustina (Bergh, 1900)
 Aeolidiella hulli Risbec, 1928: synonym of Anteaeolidiella cacaotica (Stimpson, 1855)
 Aeolidiella indica Bergh, 1888: synonym of Anteaeolidiella indica (Bergh, 1888)
 Aeolidiella japonica Eliot, 1913: synonym of Bulbaeolidia japonica (Eliot, 1913)
 Aeolidiella lurana Marcus & Marcus, 1967: synonym of Anteaeolidiella lurana (Marcus & Marcus, 1967)
 Aeolidiella multicolor Macnae, 1954: synonym of Anteaeolidiella saldanhensis (Barnard, 1927)
 Aeolidiella occidentalis Bergh, 1875: synonym of Baeolidia occidentalis Bergh, 1875
 Aeolidiella olivae MacFarland, 1966: synonym of Anteaeolidiella oliviae
 Aeolidiella orientalis Bergh, 1888: synonym of Anteaeolidiella orientalis (Bergh, 1888)
 Aeolidiella saldanhensis Barnard, 1927: synonym of Anteaeolidiella saldanhensis (Barnard, 1927)
 Aeolidiella soemmeringii Bergh, 1882: synonym of Aeolidiella alderi (Cocks, 1852)
 Aeolidiella stephanieae Valdés, 2005: synonym of Berghia stephanieae (Valdés, 2005)
 Aeolidiella takanosimensis Baba, 1930: synonym of Anteaeolidiella foulisi (Angas, 1864)

References

 Bergh R. (1867). Phidiana lynceus og Ismaila monstrosa. Videnskabelige Meddelelser fra Dansk Naturhistoriske Forening, Copenhagen, 1866(7-9): 97-130, pls. 3-4

 Further reading 
 Vaught, K.C. (1989). A classification of the living Mollusca. American Malacologists: Melbourne, FL (USA). . XII, 195 pp
 Gofas, S.; Le Renard, J.; Bouchet, P. (2001). Mollusca, in: Costello, M.J. et al. (Ed.) (2001). European register of marine species: a check-list of the marine species in Europe and a bibliography of guides to their identification''. Collection Patrimoines Naturels, 50: pp. 180–213

External links

Aeolidiidae